John States Seybold (July 2, 1897 – April 19, 1982) was Governor of the Panama Canal Zone from 1952 to 1956.

Biography
Seybold was born on July 2, 1897 in Topeka, Kansas. He attended Polk Grade School and graduated from Topeka High School. Seybold then studied at the University of Kansas for two years before entering the United States Military Academy in June 1918.

Seybold graduated from West Point in June 1920. He was commissioned a second lieutenant in the U.S. Army Coast Artillery Corps, and later transferred to the U.S. Army Corps of Engineers. He earned a B.S. degree in civil engineering at the Rensselaer Polytechnic Institute in June 1922. Seybold served with the 11th Engineers in the Panama Canal Zone from November 1922 to October 1925.

Seybold commanded a company in the 1st Engineers at Fort Hancock, New Jersey from November 1925 to June 1927. He taught military science and tactics at Texas A&M College from September 1928 to July 1934. Seybold then served as an assistant to the district engineer in Vicksburg, Mississippi until May 1938. He was subsequently assigned to the Corps of Engineers headquarters staff in Washington, D.C.

During World War II, Seybold served in North Africa and Europe from April 1943 to May 1945, earning the Legion of Merit and the Bronze Star Medal.

After the war, Seybold served as district engineer in Syracuse, New York, Baltimore, Maryland and Bismarck, North Dakota. He then served as division engineer in Omaha, Nebraska and San Francisco, California. Seybold became chief of personnel at Corps of Engineers headquarters in May 1951. He was promoted to brigadier general on June 30, 1951.

Seybold served as Governor of the Panama Canal Zone from 1952 to 1956. Seybold hosted Queen Elizabeth II's first-ever state visit when she visited the Canal Zone in November 1953.

Seybold retired from active duty in the Army on November 30, 1955 and was advanced to major general on the retired list. He then completed his four-year term as governor in May 1956.

Seybold lived in Washington, D.C. after retirement and died on April 19, 1982 at Sibley Hospital. He was interred at Arlington National Cemetery three days later.

References

External links
Panama Canal Authority biography

1897 births
1982 deaths
People from Topeka, Kansas
University of Kansas alumni
United States Military Academy alumni
Military personnel from Kansas
United States Army Corps of Engineers personnel
Rensselaer Polytechnic Institute alumni
American civil engineers
Texas A&M University faculty
United States Army personnel of World War II
Recipients of the Legion of Merit
United States Army generals
Governors of the Panama Canal Zone
Military personnel from Washington, D.C.
Burials at Arlington National Cemetery